The House Select Committee on Current Pornographic Materials, commonly known as the Gathings Committee, was a select committee of the United States House of Representatives which was active in 1952 and 1953.  Representative Ezekiel C. Gathings, Democrat from Arkansas, was its chairman, appointed by Speaker of the House Sam Rayburn. H. Ralph Burton was the committee's general counsel.  

Representative Gathings was troubled by the contents of the pulp literature, paperback books and comic books he saw on local newsstands, in particular Tereska Torres' 1950 bestseller Women's Barracks and its cover, worried that they would stimulate young people to commit rape. The  committee formed in reaction to the book's popularity and used it as an example of how paperback books "promoted moral degeneracy". Gaithings launched a Congressional investigation into the paperback book industry, becoming so zealous that he earned the mockery of some journalists. In addition to Women's Barracks, other books investigated by the committee were The Tormented, Spring Fire, Unmoral, Forbidden, Artist's Model, and The Wayward Bus.

The Committee began its investigation in 1952 and issued its report in 1953. The report alleged that 100 million obscene comic books were sold in the United States each month, that one in ten American men read girlie magazines, and that these were problems calling for censorship on the Federal level. The chief result of the report was to turn Gathings into a laughing stock. 

Torres' book was not banned nationwide in the US because the publisher, Fawcett Gold Medal, agreed to add a narrator who commented disapprovingly on the characters' behavior so as to "teach moral lessons" about the "problem" of lesbianism. The publicity from the government investigation prompted the book's second edition.

References

Further reading 
"No Witch Hunt," Newsweek (7 July 1952): 80;
W. W. Wade, "Libraries and Intellectual Freedom," in Collier's 1954 Yearbook (New York: Collier, 1954), p. 334.
James Stuart Olson, "Gathings Committee", in Historical Dictionary of the 1950s, (Greenwood Publishing Group, 2000), p. 109
David Hajdu, "The ten-cent plague", bookforum.com, accessed July 15, 2010
United States House of Representatives, Report of the Select Committee on Current Pornographic Materials, 82d. Congress, House Report No. 2510 (Government Printing Office, serial 11578, December 31, 1952)
U.S. Congress, House, Select Committee on Current Pornographic Materials, Investigation of Literature Allegedly Containing Objectionable Material: Hearings before the Select Committee on Current Pornographic Materials, December 1, 2, 3, 4, and 5, 1952, 82nd Congress, 2nd session.

Current Pornographic Materials 
Sex crimes in the United States
Censorship in the United States
American pornography
1952 establishments in Washington, D.C.
1953 disestablishments in Washington, D.C.